Parisville is an unincorporated community in Paris Township of Huron County in the U.S. state of Michigan.

Parisville is notable as one of the first Polish American settlements in the United States, having arrived around 1848.  Parisville was named after Paris, Ontario by early settlers who lived in the Canadian town for a short period before moving on to the United States.  Once a thriving community with numerous businesses, Parisville is now a quiet community of around 2 dozen homes and St. Mary's Catholic Church.

Further reading

References 

Unincorporated communities in Huron County, Michigan
Polish-American culture in Michigan
Populated places established in 1848
Unincorporated communities in Michigan